Numata Dam  is a rockfill dam located in Hokkaido Prefecture in Japan. The dam is used for irrigation and water supply. The catchment area of the dam is 62.6 km2. The dam impounds about 277  ha of land when full and can store 34800 thousand cubic meters of water. The construction of the dam was started on 1972 and completed in 1991.

References

Dams in Hokkaido